Kongsrudia is a genus of sea snails, marine gastropod mollusks in the family Pyramidellidae, the pyrams and their allies.

Species
Species within the genus Kongsrudia include:
 Kongsrudia approximans (Dautzenberg, 1912)
 Kongsrudia ersei (Schander, 1994)
 Kongsrudia gruveli (Dautzenberg, 1910)
 Kongsrudia mutata (Dautzenberg, 1912)
 Kongsrudia rolani Lygre & Schander, 2010

References

External links
 To World Register of Marine Species

Pyramidellidae